In baseball statistics, earned run average (ERA) is the mean of earned runs given up by a pitcher per nine innings pitched (i.e. the traditional length of a game). It is determined by dividing the number of earned runs allowed by the number of innings pitched and multiplying by nine. Runs resulting from defensive errors (including pitchers' defensive errors) are recorded as unearned runs and are not used to determine ERA.

This is a list of the top 100 players in career earned run average, who have thrown at least 1,000 innings.

Ed Walsh holds the MLB earned run average record with a 1.816. Addie Joss (1.887) and Jim Devlin (1.896) are the only other pitchers with a career earned run average under 2.000.

Key

List

Stats updated as of the end of the 2022 season.

See also
Baseball statistics
List of Major League Baseball annual ERA leaders

Notes

References

External links

ERA
ERA in career